Rugby in Germany may refer to:

Rugby league in Germany
Rugby union in Germany